Robinzon Díaz Henriquez (born September 19, 1983) is a Dominican former professional baseball catcher. He played in Major League Baseball (MLB) for the Toronto Blue Jays and Pittsburgh Pirates. He was the bullpen catcher for the Milwaukee Brewers from 2017 to 2020.

Professional career

Toronto Blue Jays
On April 23, Díaz made his Major League debut with the Toronto Blue Jays against the Tampa Bay Rays and went 0-for-4 with a strikeout.

Pittsburgh Pirates

On August 25, 2008, Díaz was traded to the Pittsburgh Pirates as the player to be named later to complete a trade for José Bautista and was assigned to the Triple-A Indianapolis Indians. After spending several days with Indianapolis, he was called up by the Pirates on September 2. On September 7, 2008, Díaz got his first major league hit, a single off San Francisco Giants pitcher Jonathan Sánchez.

Díaz began the 2009 season in Triple-A but was recalled to the Pirates late in April after starting catcher Ryan Doumit became sidelined with a broken wrist. He would serve mainly as backup to fellow rookie catcher Jason Jaramillo and as an occasional pinch hitter.  In his 31 games with Pittsburgh, Díaz compiled a .295 batting average and drove in 18 runs. He was optioned back to Triple-A when Doumit returned from injury on July 10.

He was designated for assignment at the end of the 2009 season, and released on November 30, 2009.

Detroit Tigers

On December 8, 2009, he was signed to a contract by the Detroit Tigers.

Díaz spent the 2010 season as a member of the Toledo Mud Hens, finishing the season batting .255 with a home run and 21 RBI in 71 games. He filed for free agency on November 6, 2010.

Texas Rangers
On January 18, 2011, he was signed to a minor league contract by the Texas Rangers.

He also played for the Tigres del Licey in the Dominican Winter League.

Los Angeles Angels of Anaheim
Diaz signed a minor league contract with the Los Angeles Angels of Anaheim on December 23, 2011. He was released on August 7, 2012.

Return to Texas
The Rangers re-signed Diaz to a minor league contract on August 12, 2012, and assigned him to the Triple-A Round Rock Express. On November 3, he was declared a minor league free agent by Major League Baseball.

Milwaukee Brewers
On January 18, 2013, Díaz signed a minor league contract with the Milwaukee Brewers.  He started the 2013 season with the Brewers' Double-A affiliate Huntsville Stars. He split the season with the Stars and Triple-A Nashville, where in 108 games total, he hit .302/.335/.433 with seven home runs and 42 RBI. After joining the Sounds on June 29, 2013, Díaz closed out the year by hitting .328 (58-for-127) with four home runs and 20 RBI in 50 Pacific Coast League games.

On October 1, 2013, Díaz signed a minor league deal with an invitation to spring training with the Brewers. He returned to Nashville for the start of the 2014 season.

The Brewers signed Diaz to another minor-league deal on February 23, 2015. The same day he was assigned to Triple-A Colorado Springs Sky Sox. On April 6, 2015 he was demoted to the Double-A Helena Brewers. On April 17, 2015, he was promoted back to Triple-A Colorado Springs. After the season, he was selected to the roster for the Dominican Republic national baseball team at the 2015 WBSC Premier12.

Return to Toronto
On February 26, 2016, Díaz signed a minor league contract with the Toronto Blue Jays.

Olmecas de Tabasco
On May 17, 2016, Diaz signed with the Olmecas de Tabasco of the Mexican League. He was released on July 1, 2016.

Baseball staff
Diaz became the bullpen catcher with the Milwaukee Brewers during the 2017 baseball season. He remained in the position through 2020.

References

External links

1983 births
Living people
Brevard County Manatees players
Charleston AlleyCats players
Colorado Springs Sky Sox players
Dominican Republic baseball coaches
Dominican Republic expatriate baseball players in Canada
Dominican Republic expatriate baseball players in Mexico
Dominican Republic expatriate baseball players in the United States
Dominican Republic national baseball team players
Dunedin Blue Jays players
Estrellas Orientales players
Frisco RoughRiders players
Gigantes del Cibao players
Gulf Coast Blue Jays players
Huntsville Stars players
Indianapolis Indians players

Major League Baseball bullpen catchers
Major League Baseball catchers
Major League Baseball players from the Dominican Republic
Medicine Hat Blue Jays players
Mexican League baseball catchers
Milwaukee Brewers coaches
Nashville Sounds players
New Hampshire Fisher Cats players
Olmecas de Tabasco players
Pittsburgh Pirates players
Pulaski Blue Jays players
Round Rock Express players
Salt Lake Bees players
Syracuse Chiefs players
Tigres del Licey players
Toledo Mud Hens players
Toronto Blue Jays players
2015 WBSC Premier12 players